Siavash Yazdani (born ) is an Iranian professional footballer who plays as a centre-back.

Club career

Siah Jamegan
Yazdani joined Siah Jamegan in summer 2012. He was with Siah Jamegan in the 2012–13 Iran Football's 2nd Division and promoting with them to Division 1. He was a regular starter in his second season with Siah Jamgean while they failed to gain promotion to the Pro League after losing to Paykan in the play-off.

Paykan
On July 7, 2014 he joined newly promoted Paykan with a 3-year contract. He made his debut for Paykan on September 12, 2014 against Zob Ahan as a starter.

Sepahan
He signed a contract with Sepahan.

Esteghlal
He transferred from Sepahan to Esteghlal club in summer 2019.

Malavan
He joined Malavan on loan from Esteghlal to perform his military service.

International career
He was called for the first time for the Iran national team (Team Melli) in 2019.

He made his debut for the Iran national team in the 2022 Qatar World Cup qualifier against the UAE national team on February 1, 2022, in a 2-0 victory for Iran. He came on for Milad Mohammadi in a late substitution in the 82nd minute.

References

External links
 
 Siavash Yazdani at PersianLeague.com
 Siavash Yazdani at IranLeague.ir
 

Living people
Iranian footballers
Siah Jamegan players
Paykan F.C. players
Sepahan S.C. footballers
Esteghlal F.C. players
1992 births
Sportspeople from Mashhad
Association football defenders